Albert Aspen  (born 1 March 1934) is a British former wrestler. He competed at the 1960 Summer Olympics and the 1964 Summer Olympics.

He also represented England and won a bronze medal in the -62 kg division at the 1958 British Empire and Commonwealth Games in Cardiff, Wales. He won two further bronze medals at the 1962 British Empire and Commonwealth Games in Perth, Western Australia and the 1966 British Empire and Commonwealth Games in Kingston, Jamaica.

Aspen was appointed Member of the Order of the British Empire (MBE) in the 2020 Birthday Honours for services to wrestling.

References

External links
 

1934 births
Living people
British male sport wrestlers
Olympic wrestlers of Great Britain
Wrestlers at the 1960 Summer Olympics
Wrestlers at the 1964 Summer Olympics
Sportspeople from Bolton
Commonwealth Games medallists in wrestling
Commonwealth Games bronze medallists for England
Wrestlers at the 1958 British Empire and Commonwealth Games
Wrestlers at the 1962 British Empire and Commonwealth Games
Wrestlers at the 1966 British Empire and Commonwealth Games
Members of the Order of the British Empire
Medallists at the 1958 British Empire and Commonwealth Games
Medallists at the 1962 British Empire and Commonwealth Games
Medallists at the 1966 British Empire and Commonwealth Games